USS Spruance (DDG-111) is a United States Navy . She is the 61st ship in her class. Spruance is the second ship to be named for Admiral Raymond A. Spruance (1886–1969), who commanded American naval forces at the Battles of Midway and the Philippine Sea. He was later Ambassador to the Philippines. Her keel was laid down on 14 May 2009. She was christened by the admiral's granddaughter, Ellen Spruance Holscher, on 5 June 2010 in Bath, Maine at Bath Iron Works, where the ship was built at a cost of $1 billion.  The completed ship left Bath on 1 September 2011 for her commissioning in Key West, Florida on 1 October 2011.

Spruance was the first of the U.S. Navy's destroyers to be fitted with the Gigabit Ethernet Data Multiplex System (GEDMS), manufactured by the Boeing Company. GEDMS provides an Internet Protocol (IP) based backbone for video and data services on the ship. The bridge features touch screen controls and color readouts instead of gauges.

Ship history
She was built by Bath Iron Works in Bath, Maine. At her christening on 5 June 2010, the principal address was delivered by Honorable John Baldacci of Maine, and the vessel was christened by Ellen Spruance Holscher as the ship's sponsor. Commander Tate Westbrook was the ship's first commanding officer.

She sailed from San Diego on her maiden deployment on 16 October 2013, heading for Asia under the command of Commander George Kessler who was succeeded by Commander Daniel Cobian
Sailors from the Arleigh Burke-class guided-missile destroyer Spruance rescued a Filipino mariner, 18 Jan. 2014 who had fallen overboard from his vessel while transiting the Singapore Strait.
Spruance returned to Naval Base San Diego on 17 April 2014 following the completion of her maiden deployment to the Western Pacific Ocean.

On 18 April 2019, Spruance arrived in Sri Lanka for the 25th anniversary of CARAT 2019 series

The Arleigh Burke-class guided-missile destroyer USS Spruance (DDG-111) and Ticonderoga-class guided-missile cruiser USS Mobile Bay (CG-53) departed the Port of Seattle 2 Aug. 2019, officially ending Seattle Fleet Week.

Spruance participated in RIMPAC 2022.

Deployments
 16 October 2013 – 17 April 2014 Maiden deployment 7th Fleet
 May 2016 - 14 November 2016 7th Fleet
 October  2018 - May 2019 7th Fleet and 5th Fleet

Awards
 Battle "E" - (2013, 2014, 2016, 2018)
 Coast Guard Meritorious Team Commendation Ribbon with Operational Distinguishing Device  - (2017) 
 Vice Admiral Thomas H. Copeman III Material Readiness Award - (2016)
 Safety Excellence Award - (2013, 2014, 2016, 2019)
 Abraham Lincoln Carrier Strike Group’s (ABECSG) deployment tomahawk strike warfare Award for Thor’s Hammer 2022.

References

External links

Official Ship's Site

 

Arleigh Burke-class destroyers
2010 ships
Ships built in Bath, Maine